King of California is a 2007 American comedy-drama film written and directed by Mike Cahill, in his debut as a screenwriter and director. It premiered January 24, 2007 at the 2007 Sundance Film Festival and opened in limited release in North America on September 14, 2007. It stars Michael Douglas as a mentally ill man who thinks he has discovered buried treasure, and Evan Rachel Wood as his weary daughter.

Plot
16-year-old Miranda has been abandoned by her mother, and has dropped out of school. She supports herself working at McDonald's while her father, Charlie, is in a mental institution.

When Charlie is released, Miranda finds the relatively peaceful existence she's built for herself disrupted. Charlie is supposed to have recovered, but he rambles on with strange theories. For example, he tells her that naked Chinese men are swimming ashore so they can live in California. He is also obsessed with the idea that the long-lost treasure of Spanish explorer Father Juan Florismarte Torres is buried near their suburban California house in the Santa Clarita Valley. Armed with a metal detector and a stack of treasure-hunting books, he finds reason to believe that the gold is underneath the local Costco, and encourages Miranda to get a job there so they can plan a way to excavate it.

Initially skeptical, Miranda finds herself joining in Charlie's questionable antics to give him one last shot at accomplishing his dreams. She starts working at Costco and ingratiates herself with the manager and his "swingers" group, giving her a chance to steal a master key. She, Charlie, and their friend Pepper use the key to enter the Costco after hours, setting off an alarm—but Pepper quickly reprograms it to make it seem it was triggered by a propane leak. They hide inside until firefighters have come and gone, then begin drilling through the floor, where they find a smelly underground river. Charlie dons scuba gear, dives into the river, then emerges, claims it is indeed where the treasure is buried. Meanwhile, Pepper, standing watch outside, is spotted by a police patrol. Worried that they will notice lights inside the store, he speeds off to divert them. When they catch up with him and arrest him, they find the walkie-talkie he was using to communicate with Miranda and Charlie, and deduce that a robbery is taking place at the store.

Charlie emerges from the river. He gives Miranda a tag and tells her not to lose it. When the police arrive at the Costco, Charlie is seen carrying a small, heavy chest, hiding from the police. He jumps into the river again, swims farther, and sees a bright light and swims towards it. Miranda's off-screen voice says that Charlie's body was never found, although he is seen still alive, swimming in the river.

The next day, Miranda visits Costco and finds the product the tag belongs to, a dishwasher different than the one which she had previously admired. Using a credit card Charlie obtained for her, she buys it and takes it to the beach in her old car. When she opens it, she is seen bathed in a golden glow and a slow smile spreads across her face, implying that Charlie has cached the gold inside it. Hearing a commotion on the beach, she finds naked Chinese men coming ashore.

Cast
 Michael Douglas as Charlie
 Evan Rachel Wood as Miranda
 Allisyn Ashley Arm as young Miranda
 Willis Burks II as Pepper
 Laura Kachergus as Rita
 Paul Lieber as Doug
 Kathleen Wilhoite as Kelly
 Greg Davis Jr. as Chuchu
 Angel Oquendo as Younger cop
 Ashley Greene as McDonald's customer
 Will Rothhaar as Security guard
 Jason Auer as Costco Employee

Production
Director-screenwriter Mike Cahill wrote a draft of the script in the mid-1980s, but wasn't pleased with it and put it away, focusing instead on writing novels. He turned down an offer to finance the film because he refused to shoot it in Albuquerque.

According to Michael Douglas, King of California was filmed in only 31 days. Cahill said Douglas became interested in the project when he was sent the script. Co-star Evan Rachel Wood said that Douglas was so funny on the shoot, he often incapacitated the cast and crew with laughter, requiring scenes to be reshot.

Release
The film premiered on January 24, 2007 in Sundance Film Festival and on September 14, 2007 in United States.

Box office
At the end of its box office run, King of California grossed $268,461 in North America and $759,238 in other territories, for a worldwide total of $1,027,699. It earned a weekend gross of $35,814 playing in 5 theaters, with a per-theatre average of $7,162 and ranking #58. Its biggest overseas markets were Italy, Germany and France, where it grossed $300,080, $143,683 and $121,140 respectively.

Critical response
As of January 6, 2008 on the review aggregator Rotten Tomatoes, 63% of critics gave the film positive reviews, based on 68 reviews with an average rating of 6.2/10. The site's critics' consensus reads: "A quirky and often touching comedy about a mature teenager and her manic depressive father, King of California is a charming tale of familial relations and treasure hunting". On Metacritic, the film had an average score of 63 out of 100, based on 22 reviews, indicating "generally favorable reviews".

New York Times film critic Stephen Holden described King of California as "a sequel of sorts" to One Flew Over the Cuckoo's Nest (1975), noting the similarity between the characters of Charlie and Randle McMurphy (played by Jack Nicholson). Praising Michael Douglas' acting as "his strongest screen performance since Wonder Boys," Holden concluded that the film "is really a Don Quixote-like fable about nonconformity and pursuing your impossible dream to the very end."

Ted Fry of The Seattle Times also extolled Michael Douglas' acting as "one of his stronger performances", and called King of California "a strong effort by first-time writer/director Mike Cahill that will keep you bemused for its idiosyncratic voice."

Home media
King of California was released on DVD in the U.K. in early June 2008.

References

External links
 
 
 
 
 

2007 films
2007 comedy-drama films
American comedy-drama films
2000s Spanish-language films
Films set in California
Films set in Los Angeles County, California
Films shot in Los Angeles
American independent films
Treasure hunt films
2007 directorial debut films
2007 independent films
2000s English-language films
2000s American films